Kong Karls Land or King Charles Land is an island group in the Svalbard archipelago, in the Arctic Ocean.

The islands, which have the largest concentration of polar bear in Svalbard, are part of the Nordaust-Svalbard Nature Reserve, along with Nordaustlandet and Kvitøya. There is a ban on traffic to the islands, which includes the areas of the sea up to 500 metres away from shore and the airspace up to 500 metres above the area.

Kong Karls Land was discovered by an expedition sent by the Muscovy Company in 1617, probably from a high point on Barentsøya. They named the group Wiche Islands, after a member of the company, Richard Wyche.

Ecology
The polar bear is found during portions of the year at Kong Karls Land; this bear feeds on local harp seals and ring seals. The sub-population of polar bears found here is a genetically distinct set of polar bears specifically associated with the Barents Sea region.

See also 
List of islands in the Arctic Ocean

References

External links 
Kong Karls Land from www.Svalbard-images.com

 
Islands of Svalbard